Rowland Flat (formerly Rowland's Flat and Rowlands Flat) is a small South Australian town in the Barossa Valley, located on the Barossa Valley Highway between Lyndoch and Tanunda. The town has an elevation of 294m and is nestled at the foot of the Barossa Ranges. It is best known for its wineries, and proximity to Jacobs Creek, Jacobs Creek Visitor's Centre and Novotel Barossa Valley Resort.

The town was originally known as Rowland's Flat, named, with an errant apostrophe, after Edward Rowlands who claimed the area under the 27th Special Survey in 1839. The township itself was surveyed in 1850.

Rowland Flat township is in the Barossa Council local government area, but the western part of the area is in Light Regional Council. It is in the state electoral district of Schubert and the federal Division of Barker.

Wineries
 Orlando Wines
 Lou Miranda Estate
 Jenke Vineyard Cellars
 Liebichwein
 1847

Other businesses
 Rocla Quarry
 Tanunda Links Golf Course
 Novotel Barossa Valley Resort

See also
 Barossa Valley (wine)

References

Towns in South Australia
Barossa Valley